Brachyolene albostictica is a species of beetle in the family Cerambycidae. It was described by Stephan von Breuning in 1948. It is known from Gabon.

References

Endemic fauna of Gabon
Tetraulaxini
Beetles described in 1948
Taxa named by Stephan von Breuning (entomologist)